Drimnagh is a suburb in  Dublin, Ireland to the south of the city between Walkinstown, Crumlin and Inchicore, bordered by the Grand Canal to the north and east. Drimnagh is in postal district Dublin 12.

History

Early to mediaeval
Drimnagh derives its name from the word druimneach, or country with ridges. A neolithic settlement discovered and a funerary bowl found in a burial site. The site was demolished, but the bowl is on view in the National Museum.  

The lands of Drimnagh were taken from their Irish owners by Strongbow, who gave them to the Barnwell family, who had arrived in Ireland with Strongbow in 1167 and had settled in Berehaven in Munster. The people of Munster killed the family except for Hugh de Barnwell, and this youth was given Drimnagh as compensation. The lands and castle were considered safe, as they were relatively far away from the Irish strongholds in the Wicklow mountains.

Modern history
Drimnagh was farmland until the mid-1930s, when some of the first tenement clearances brought city centre residents from one-room hovels to terraced and semi-detached houses in a series of roads named after the mountain ranges of Ireland. The suburb consists of one area close to Drimnagh Castle and Lansdowne Valley, with three-bedroom private housing built by Associated Properties, and another area (the larger part) built by Dublin Corporation and consisting of three-bedroom 'Kitchen Houses' and two-bedroom 'Parlour Houses' bordering the Grand Canal and Crumlin. The two areas meet at the parish church, the Church of Our Lady of Good Counsel, in the centre of Drimnagh, built in 1943.

The Dublin Corporation housing area was originally considered part of an area known as North Crumlin from its construction in the mid-1930s until the introduction of the postal code system during the mid-1970s.

Notable people

Patrick Bergin, actor
Gabriel Byrne, actor
Patricia Cahill, singer
Michael Carruth, boxer, boxed for Drimnagh but is from Greenhills
Frank Clarke, Chief Justice of Ireland
Eamonn Coghlan, athlete
Aisling Daly, MMA
Dean Delany, footballer
Alan Dukes, former Fine Gael leader, born in the area
Tom Dunne, musician, broadcaster
Tony Dunne, footballer
Jimmy Holmes, footballer
Patrick Kavanagh, Olympic footballer
James Keane, musician
Seán Keane, fiddle player of The Chieftains
Brian Kerr, former Irish international football team manager
Kevin Moran, footballer
Rick O'Shea, broadcaster
Seán Potts, musician
Jonathan Rhys Meyers, actor and musician
Philip Sutcliffe, two-time Olympic boxer
Colm Wilkinson, actor and singer
Enda Stevens, footballer

Places of interest
 Drimnagh Castle is the only castle in Ireland which still has a moat encircling it, and is one of Dublin's few remaining medieval castles. It dates from the 12th century and was built by the Barnwell family.
 Mourne Road Church is at the centre of Drimnagh.
 Our Lady's Children's Hospital, Crumlin is located within Drimnagh.

Sport
 Guinness Rugby Football Club – based at the Iveagh Grounds.
 Good Counsel GAA – have operated in the Drimnagh area since 1954.
 St James Gaels GAA – also based at the Iveagh Grounds.
 Football Clubs include Mourne Celtic, Drimnagh Celtic and St. John Bosco.
 Drimnagh Boxíng Club on Keeper road
 Parkrun every Saturday morning at Brickfield Park.

Education
 Drimnagh Castle CBS is a primary and secondary school for boys which was built in 1954 right next to the site of the castle. Over the past 50 years notable students included the politician Charlie O'Connor; footballers Kevin Moran, Niall Quinn, Dean Delaney and Graham Barrett, and radio presenters Rick O'Shea (RTE), Andy Preston (Ian Moore, FM104), and Chris Murray (Anthony Hanlon, LMFM).
 Our Lady of Good Counsel School on Mourne Road
 St John Bosco Youth Centre

Transport
Drimnagh is served by LUAS trams and Dublin Bus.

Tram

Drimnagh is on the Red Line of the Dublin City tram system.

From West to East it is served by Luas stops:

Black Horse - Drimnagh - GoldenBridge -Suir Road.

Bus

Drimnagh served by  Dublin Bus routes: 

18, 27, 56A, 77A, 77X, 122, 123, 151.

See also
List of towns and villages in Ireland

References

External links
Drimnagh Residents Associations
Drimnagh is Good

Towns and villages in Dublin (city)
Civil parishes of Uppercross